2025 Jaane Kya Hoga Aage is an Indian futuristic television series, which premiered on 31 August 2015 and was broadcast on Sony Entertainment Television. The series is produced by Sanjiv Sharma and Vipul D. Shah of Optimystix Entertainment. The show is set in 2025, and revolves around Joshi family.

Plot
Set in 2025, Naisha brings her dead mother Ganga Joshi virtually alive via a hologram much a surprise to her family. She died 14 years ago in 2011 in a mental shock from an accident. Ganga feels that her family is not alike from the past and strives to retrieve the way it was in 2011. During this journey, many obstacles hit Joshi family but Ganga uses her ideas to tackle them and make the family live in peace.

Cast
Lubna Salim as Ganga Joshi, Inder's Wife, Navin, Naisha, Neetika's mother, Nick's Grandmother and Geetanjali's Mother in Law and Jamuna's twin Sister.
Sunil Barve as Inder Joshi, Navin, Naisha, Neetika's father, Nick's Grandfather and Geetanjali's Father in Law
Akhlaque Khan as Navin Joshi, Inder and Ganga's Son
Garima Jain as Geetanjali Joshi, Navin's wife, Inder and Ganga's Daughter in Law.
Sanyukta Timsina as Naisha Joshi, Inder and Ganga's Daughter
Urmila Tiwari as Neetika Joshi, Inder and Ganga's Daughter, Her Catchphrase is:-Jamana Jo Badal Gaya Hai.
Mitansh Gera as Nick Navin Joshi, Navin and Geetanjali's Son
Monica Castelino as Monica Mhatre, Joshi's Househelp
Arvind Vaidya as Mr.Patel
Paresh Bhatt as Paresh Patel
Sharmilee Raj as Nirmal Joshi, Touch Me Not Bua, Inder's Sister.
 Nayan Shukla as Chaitanya Thapar, Neetika's husband
 Ashwini Ekbote as Shivani Thapar, Neetika's Mother-in-law.
Payal Rohatgi as Forum (special appearance)
Navina Bole as Sulagana

References

External links 

Sony Entertainment Television original programming
2015 Indian television series debuts
2015 Indian television series endings
Hindi-language television shows
Television series set in the 2020s
Androids in television
Robots in television
Indian science fiction television series
Indian television sitcoms